Zohn is a surname. Notable people with the surname include:

Alejandro Zohn (1930–2000), Mexican architect
Ethan Zohn (born 1973), American professional soccer player
Ricardo Zohn-Muldoon (born 1962), Mexican-American composer and chair of the composition department at Eastman School of Music
Shachne Zohn (1910–2012), Ukrainian born former dean of the Yeshiva Torah Vodaas, who later lived in Jerusalem
Sheryl Zohn, American television writer and producer

See also 
Zohn Ahl, roll-and-move board game played by the Kiowa Indians of North America
Zohn Nunataks, set of three nunataks, the largest being Cheeks Nunatak, rising to 1,310 m in the southwest part of Grossman Nunataks, Palmer Land

See also
Zahn, a surname
Zon (disambiguation)
Zonn (disambiguation)

References